Blaenau Gwent is a unitary authority area in eastern South Wales. It has three heavily industrialised valleys, which are the setting for the eight post-medieval scheduled monuments. The uplands have three, possibly four prehistoric monuments, and a medieval site is in the south of the borough. There are 13 scheduled sites in total. The county borough was part of the historic county of Monmouthshire (historic), although shifting boundaries mean Y Domen Fawr round cairn was formerly in Glamorgan.

Scheduled monuments have statutory protection. It is illegal to disturb the ground surface or any standing remains. The compilation of the list is undertaken by Cadw Welsh Historic Monuments, which is an executive agency of the National Assembly of Wales. The list of scheduled monuments below is supplied by Cadw with additional material from RCAHMW and Glamorgan-Gwent Archaeological Trust.

Scheduled monuments in Blaenau Gwent

See also

List of Cadw properties
List of castles in Wales
List of hill forts in Wales
Historic houses in Wales
List of monastic houses in Wales
List of museums in Wales
List of Roman villas in Wales
Grade II* listed buildings in Blaenau Gwent

References
Coflein is the online database of RCAHMW: Royal Commission on the Ancient and Historical Monuments of Wales, GGAT is the Glamorgan-Gwent Archaeological Trust, Cadw is the Welsh Historic Monuments Agency

Blaenau Gwent
Buildings and structures in Blaenau Gwent
History of Blaenau Gwent